Berberana is a municipality and town located in the province of Burgos, Castile and León, Spain. According to the 2004 census (INE), the municipality has a population of 81 inhabitants.

The municipality of Berberana is made up of two towns: Berberana (seat or capital) and Valpuesta.

References 

Municipalities in the Province of Burgos